The 1980 All-Ireland Minor Hurling Championship was the 50th staging of the All-Ireland Minor Hurling Championship since its establishment by the Gaelic Athletic Association in 1928.

Cork entered the championship as the defending champions, however, they were beaten by Tipperary in the Munster semi-final.

On 7 September 1980, Tipperary won the championship following a 2-15 to 1-10 defeat of Wexford in the All-Ireland final. This was their 14th All-Ireland title and their first in four championship seasons.

Results

Leinster Minor Hurling Championship

Leinster first round

Leinster quarter-finals

Leinster semi-finals

Leinster final

Munster Minor Hurling Championship

Munster first round

Munster semi-finals

Munster final

All-Ireland Minor Hurling Championship

All-Ireland semi-finals

All-Ireland final

External links
 All-Ireland Minor Hurling Championship: Roll Of Honour

Minor
All-Ireland Minor Hurling Championship